Cook Islands competed at the 2017 Asian Indoor and Martial Arts Games held in Ashgabat, Turkmenistan from September 17 to 27. 10 athletes competed in 4 different sports. Cook Islands team couldn't receive any medal at the Games.

Cook Islands also made its first appearance at an Asian Indoor and Martial Arts Games event during the Games along with other Oceania nations.

Participants

3×3 basketball

Cook Islands participated in 3×3 basketball.

Summary

Women's tournament 

Team roster
Janet Main
Terai Sadler
Adoniah Lewis
Keziah Lewis

Indoor Athletics

Cook Islands participated in indoor athletics.

Key
Note–Ranks given for track events are within the athlete's heat only
Q = Qualified for the next round
q = Qualified for the next round as a fastest loser or, in field events, by position without achieving the qualifying target
qR = Qualified to the next round by referee judgement
NR = National record
N/A = Round not applicable for the event
Bye = Athlete not required to compete in round

Field events
Women

Short course swimming

Cook Islands participated in short course swimming.

Men

Women

Weightlifting

Cook Islands participated in weightlifting.

Women

References 

Nations at the 2017 Asian Indoor and Martial Arts Games
2017 in Cook Islands sport